Po Tat Estate, formerly called Po Lam Road Housing Development, is a public housing estate at the junction of Po Lam Road and Sau Mau Ping Road in Sau Mau Ping, Kwun Tong, Kowloon, Hong Kong, near Sau Mau Ping Estate and Tseung Kwan O Tunnel. It consists of 13 blocks and a shopping centre. In 2016, it housed a population of 24,642.

A Monkey God Temple is located at Po Tat Estate. The Monkey King Festival is celebrated there.

Background
Before Po Tat Estate was constructed, the site was a cement plant and part of the Anderson Road and Po Lam Road were laid on there. Its Phase 1, 2 and 4 consists of 6 blocks and a shopping centre completed in 2001. Another six blocks originally belonged to a HOS estate, Hiu Lam Court, but they were transferred to rental housing and occupied in 2003.

Houses

Demographics
In the 2016 by-census, Po Tat Estate recorded a population of 24,642. There were 7,391 households and an average household size of 3.3 persons.

Transport
At present, residents of Po Tat Estate are reliant on road transport, primarily buses and minibuses. In the future, a new station of the Mass Transit Railway (MTR) may be built at the estate under the East Kowloon line concept, which was proposed by the Transport and Housing Bureau in the Railway Development Strategy 2014. That document suggested that the new railway line may be built between 2019 and 2025.

References

Sau Mau Ping
Public housing estates in Hong Kong
Residential buildings completed in 2001
Residential buildings completed in 2003